Thestus alexandra is a species of beetle in the family Cerambycidae. It was described by James Thomson in 1878. It is known from Sumatra and Malaysia.

References

Lamiini
Beetles described in 1878